Ambès is a commune in the Gironde department in southwestern France.

It is located at the point, the Bec d'Ambès (Occ. bèc is cognate with Old English  bæc for beck), where the rivers Garonne and Dordogne meet to form the Gironde estuary.

Population

See also
Communes of the Gironde department

Gallery

References

Communes of Gironde